Wesson is the surname of the following people
Amy Wesson (born 1977), American fashion model
Barry Wesson (born 1977), American baseball outfielder
 Daniel B. Wesson (1825–1906), co-inventor of the Winchester rifle and co-founder of Smith & Wesson
 Daniel B. Wesson II (1916–1978), great-grandson of Daniel B. Wesson, founder Dan Wesson Firearms
 Dick Wesson (announcer) (1919–1979), American film and television announcer
 Dick Wesson (actor) (1919–1996), American character actor, comedian, comedy writer and producer
 Edward Wesson (1910–1983), English watercolour artist
 George Wesson Hawes (1848–1882), American geologist
 Herb Wesson (born 1951), American politician
 Jessica Wesson (born 1982), American actress
 Kaleb Wesson (born 1999), American basketball player
 K'zell Wesson (born 1977), American basketball player
 Marcus Wesson (born 1946), American mass murderer
 Mel Wesson (born 1958), British film, TV and video game composer 
 Paul S. Wesson (1949-2015), American physicist
 Tina Wesson (born 1960), American nurse and television personality
Will Wesson (born 1986), American freestyle skier